Mallipudur is a village near Srivilliputtur, Tamil Nadu, India.

Villages in Virudhunagar district